Lanzhou–Zhongchuan Airport intercity railway is a regional higher-speed railway located in Gansu Province, connecting the Lanzhou urban area and Lanzhou Zhongchuan Airport. As Zhongchuan Airport is quite distant from the urban area of Lanzhou, regular ground transport currently takes about an hour to make the journey and taxi journeys are expensive at around 150 to 200RMB, but with little to no time advantage over the airport bus service. Thus a higher-speed rail connection was initiated by the Lanzhou government in order to improve access to the airport, but also to the adjacent Lanzhou New Area special economic zone. The journey to the airport now takes from 30 to 40 minutes at a cost of 18.5RMB for Second Class and 22RMB for First Class.

Overview

The Lanzhou–Zhongchuan Airport intercity railway is proposed to be the first section of a longer Lanzhou–Zhangye intercity railway, connecting western Gansu cities. Starting from Lanzhou West railway station the route parallels the Lanzhou–Xinjiang High-Speed Railway for a short distance. From Fuliqu to Zhongchuan Airport  of new railway is built as a double tracked electrified line. Total investment was projected to be over 9.1 billion yuan RMB. A total of six stations is constructed, Lanzhou West railway station will allow transfers to Line 1 and Line 2 of Lanzhou Metro, Chenguanying will allow transfers to Line 1 of Lanzhou Metro. Lanzhou New Area railway station will allow transfers to future tram and metro services. Before Lanzhou New Area station, the under construction Zhongwei–Lanzhou high-speed railway branches off.

An initial groundbreaking ceremony was held on December 27, 2010. However works were not actually started. On December 21, 2012, another groundbreaking ceremony was held again with full construction now underway. The line started operation on September 30, 2015.

Fuliqu opened on January 8, 2020.

Stations

See also
Zhongwei–Lanzhou high-speed railway

References 

High-speed railway lines in China
Rail transport in Gansu
Transport in Lanzhou
Standard gauge railways in China
Airport rail links in China